The eighty-third Minnesota Legislature first convened on January 7, 2003. The 67 members of the Minnesota Senate and the 134 members of the Minnesota House of Representatives were elected during the General Election on November 5, 2002.

Sessions 
The legislature met in a regular session from January 7, 2003 to May 19, 2003. A special session began on May 20, 2003 to further discuss budget bills. The special session ended May 29, 2003.

A continuation of the regular session was held between February 2, 2004 and May 16, 2004.

Party summary 
Resignations and new members are discussed in the "Membership changes" section, below.

Senate

House of Representatives

Leadership

Senate 
President of the Senate
James Metzen (DFL-South St. Paul)

Senate Majority Leader
John Hottinger (DFL-Mankato) (2003)
Dean Johnson (DFL-Willmar) (2004)

Senate Minority Leader
Dick Day (R-Owatonna)

House of Representatives 
Speaker of the House
Steve Sviggum (R-Kenyon)

House Majority Leader
Erik Paulsen (R-Eden Prairie)

House Minority Leader
Matt Entenza (DFL-St. Paul)

Members

Senate

House of Representatives

Membership changes

Senate

House of Representatives

Notes

References 
 Historical Information about the Minnesota Legislature

External links 
Senate election results
House election results

83rd
2000s in Minnesota
2003 in Minnesota
2004 in Minnesota
2003 U.S. legislative sessions
2004 U.S. legislative sessions